Events in the year 1963 in Norway.

Incumbents
 Monarch – Olav V
 Prime Minister – Einar Gerhardsen (Labour Party) until 28 August, John Lyng (Conservative Party) until 25 September, Einar Gerhardsen (Labour Party)

Events

 21 March – MS Høegh Aronde sank near Morocco during a voyage from Sassandra to Valencia, resulting in the deaths of 15 of the 28 Norwegian crew members.
 1 July – Work begins to build Tromsø Airport
 28 August – Lyng's Cabinet was appointed.
 25 September – Gerhardsen's Fourth Cabinet was appointed.
 Norsk Hydro in cooperation with Harvey Aluminum starts Alnor, a plant at Karmøy to produce aluminium
 Municipal and county elections are held throughout the country.
 The Munch Museum was opened, 100 years after Edvard Munch's birth.

Popular culture

Sports
Football (No Data Given)

Music

Top songs of 1963 in Norway 

 Arne Bendiksen - "Jeg vil ha en blå ballong"
 Cliff Richard - "Summer Holiday"
 Ned Miller - "From a Jack to a King"
 Cliff Richard - "Lucky Lips"
 Elvis Presley - "(You're the) Devil in Disguise"
 Kyu Sakamoto - "Sukiyaki"
 Wenche Myhre - "Gi meg en cowboy til mann"
 Bobby Bare - "Detroit City"
 Cliff Richard - "Don't Talk to Him"

Film
Om Tilla, by Arne Skouen

Literature
Stein Mehren, poet, novelist, essayist and playwright, is awarded the Norwegian Critics Prize for Literature and the Mads Wiel Nygaards Endowment for Mot en verden av lys.

Notable births

January 
 

 4 January – May-Britt Moser, neuroscientist and winner of the Nobel Prize in Physiology or Medicine.
7 January – Georg Andersen, shot putter.
14 January – Steffen Kverneland, comics artist. 
15 January – Erling Kagge, adventurer and publisher.
23 January – Rune Gulliksen, ice hockey player.
30 January – Terje Holtet Larsen, journalist and author.

February 
 

3 February 
 Jørn Andersen, footballer.
 Kathrine Bomstad, swimmer.
 Liv Heløe, actress and playwright.
5 February – Jan Kvalheim, beach volleyball player.
8 February – Siri A. Meling, politician.

March 
14 March – Lisbeth Berg-Hansen, politician.

April 
 

10 April – Rune Christiansen, poet and novelist
14 April – Gunvor Eldegard, politician
20 April 
Pål Hembre, sport shooter.
Christopher Nielsen, comics artist. 
21 April – Lars Monsen, adventurer and journalist.
28 April – Beate Grimsrud, writer (died 2020).
28 April – Henrik Hellstenius, composer and musicologist

May 
4 May – Jørgen Salsten, ice hockey player.
16 May – Carl Erik Johannessen, sailor.
26 May – Merethe Lindstrøm, writer.

June 
 

4 June 
 Elin Brodin, novelist.
 Solveig Kringlebotn, operatic soprano.
10 June – Kristin Vinje, chemist and politician.
20 June 
 Viel Bjerkeset Andersen, artist
 Anne Jahren, cross-country skier.

July 
 

2 July – Christl Kvam, nurse, economist, trade unionist, civil servant, and politician.
4 July – Heidi Støre, footballer.
6 July – Rolf Terje Klungland, politician.
7 July – Geir Karlstad, speed skater.
27 July – Lars Bjønness, competition rower.

August 
 

8 August – Christian Tybring-Gjedde, politician.
9 August – Arne Hjeltnes, writer, television personality, and politician.
27 August – Kirsti Leirtrø, politician.
29 August – Hilde Frafjord Johnson, politician

September 
16 September – Vidar Kleppe, politician.
22 September – Lisa Scheibert, rower.

October 
5 October – Ronni Le Tekrø, guitarist (TNT)
18 October – Sigvart Dagsland, singer, pianist and composer

November 
 

17 November 
 Einar Hålien, newspaper editor.
 Roy Waage, politician.
19 November – Geir Jørgen Bekkevold, politician.
30 November – Einar Gausel, chess player.

December 
 

5 December – Ingrid Bjørnov, singer, songwriter, keyboard player, composer and text writer.
12 December – Arve Seland, footballer.
25 December – Øystein Fevang, singer and choir conductor.
27 December – Sigrid Brattabø Handegard, politician

Full date unknown
 Synnøve Eriksen, novelist
 Ole Amund Gjersvik, jazz musician.
 Geir Gulliksen, writer and publisher.

Notable deaths

15 January – Bertel Flaten, politician (b.1900)
1 February – Hermann Helgesen, gymnast and Olympic silver medallist (b.1889)
6 March – Ole Øisang, newspaper editor and politician (b.1893)
7 March – Joachim Holst-Jensen, film actor (b.1880)
8 March – Per Askim, naval officer (b.1881).
13 March – Edvin Paulsen, gymnast and Olympic bronze medallist (b.1889)
23 March – Thoralf Skolem, mathematician (b.1887)
24 March – Peder Holt, politician (b.1899)
28 March – Tollef Tollefsen, rower and Olympic bronze medallist (b.1885)
1 April – Agnes Mowinckel, actress and stage producer (b.1875).
10 April – Ottar Gjermundshaug, Nordic combined skier (b.1925)
11 April
 Thorleif Holbye, sailor and Olympic gold medallist (b.1883)
 Arvid Gram Paulsen, jazz musician and composer (b. 1922)
13 June – Olav Bjørnstad, rower and Olympic bronze medallist (b.1882)
14 June – Olav Hindahl, trade unionist and politician (b.1892)
17 June – Eugen Lunde, sailor and Olympic gold medallist (b.1887)
20 June – Erling Vinne, triple jumper (b.1892)
30 June – Erling Aastad, long jumper and sprinter (b.1898)
11 July – Paal Kaasen, sailor and Olympic gold medallist (b.1883)
14 July – Rasmus Hatledal, topographer and military officer (b.1885)
27 July – Trygve Bøyesen, gymnast and Olympic silver medallist (b.1886)
2 August – Thorstein Johansen, rifle shooter and Olympic gold medallist (b.1888)
7 August – Knut Markhus, educator and politician (b. 1878).
18 September – Karl Johan Edvardsen, politician (b.1883)
20 September – Thorleiv Røhn, military officer, gymnast and Olympic gold medallist (b.1881)
27 September – Svein Olsen Øraker, politician (b.1886)
2 November – Per Gulbrandsen, rower and Olympic bronze medallist (b.1897)
18 November – Astrid Skare, politician (b.1891)
1 December – Jacob Erstad, gymnast (b.1898)
16 December – Anton Beinset, journalist, newspaper editor, short story writer, crime fiction writer and politician (born 1894).
19 December – Ingolf Rød, sailor and Olympic gold medallist (b.1889)
27 December – Sigvard Sivertsen, gymnast and Olympic gold medallist (b.1881)

Full date unknown
Nils Selmer Hauff, bookseller (b.1882)
Hjalmar Holand, historian (b.1872)
Kjeld Stub Irgens, sea captain and collaborator minister (b.1879)
Lars Knutsen, shipowner (b.1884)
Magnus Olsen, linguist and professor of Norse philology (b.1878)
Ulrik Olsen, politician and Minister (b.1885)
Didrik Arup Seip, linguist and professor (b.1884)

See also

References

External links